Hewas Water is a hamlet in mid Cornwall, England, UK. It is off the A390 road near Sticker and about 3 miles (5 km) west southwest of St Austell. It is in the civil parish of St Mewan

References

Hamlets in Cornwall